Valery Nikolayevich Popov (born 6 July 1942) is a Russian diplomat and from 24 May 1990 to 25 December 1991 was the Ambassador of the Soviet Union to Austria, and from 25 December 1991 to 30 August 1996 was Ambassador of Russia to Austria.

References 

1942 births
Living people
Ambassador Extraordinary and Plenipotentiary (Soviet Union)
Ambassadors of the Soviet Union to Austria
Ambassadors of Russia to Austria